The Sonoran spotted whiptail (Aspidoscelis sonorae) is a parthenogenic species of teiid lizard found in Arizona and New Mexico in the United States, and Mexico.

References

Aspidoscelis
Reptiles described in 1964
Taxa named by John William Wright (herpetologist)
Taxa named by Charles Herbert Lowe
Reptiles of the United States
Reptiles of Mexico